Parafomoria ladaniphila is a moth of the family Nepticulidae. It is found in Morocco and Portugal.

The length of the forewings is 1.9–2 mm for males and about 2.2 mm for females. Adults are on wing from February to March.

The larvae feed on Tuberaria lignosa. They mine the leaves of their host plant. The mine consists of a tortuous narrow corridor, ending in a small blotch. The frass is deposited in a broad brown line.

External links
Fauna Europaea
bladmineerders.nl
The Cistaceae-feeding Nepticulidae (Lepidoptera) of the western Palaearctic region

Nepticulidae
Moths of Europe
Moths of Africa
Moths described in 1904